Jean Louise Langenheder Price  (September 13, 1943 – March 25, 2019) was a Democratic Party member of the Montana House of Representatives, representing District 20 from 2011 to 2019.

Price was an artist and retired art teacher. Price received her bachelor's degree in art and education from Hastings College. She also received her master's degrees, in sculpture and fibers, from Kansas State University and Southern Illinois University Carbondale. Price was also the director of the Urban Art Project of 2008, Great Falls, Montana.

Her works include:
Three Thousand and Counting – A tribute to U.S. Troops killed in Iraq.  Medium – metal foil.

References

1943 births
2019 deaths
Artists from Montana
Artists from Nebraska
Educators from Montana
American women educators
Democratic Party members of the Montana House of Representatives
People from Grand Island, Nebraska
Politicians from Great Falls, Montana
Women state legislators in Montana
Hastings College alumni
Kansas State University alumni
Southern Illinois University Carbondale alumni
Deaths from pancreatic cancer
Deaths from cancer in Montana
21st-century American women